Laura Torrisi (born 7 December 1979) is an Italian actress. Born in Sicily, she has participated in the Italian version of the reality show Big Brother and was a finalist in the Miss Italia 1998 beauty pageant.  She had her first acting role in the 1998 film Mr. Fifteen Balls.

Filmography

Film 
 Mr. Fifteen Balls, by  Francesco Nuti (1998)
 Lucignolo, by Massimo Ceccherini (1999)
 A Beautiful Wife, by Leonardo Pieraccioni (2007)
 Sharm el Sheikh - Un'estate indimenticabile,  (2010)

Television
 Il peccato e la vergogna, by Luigi Parisi -  TV series (2010-2014)
 L'onore e il rispetto,  by Salvatore Samperi  -  TV series (2009-2015)
 Le tre rose di Eva 4, by Raffaele Mertes -  TV series (2017)
 Sacrificio d'amore - TV series (2017)
 Furore - Il vento della speranza 2,  (2018)

References

External links 

1979 births
Living people
21st-century Italian actresses
Participants in Italian reality television series
Models from Sicily
Actors from Sicily